Granai (Pashto/Dari: گرانای Grānāy) is a village located in Bala Buluk District, Farah Province, Afghanistan. In 2009 it was the location of a controversial US airstrike which killed dozens of civilians.

See also 
 Granai airstrike

References

Populated places in Farah Province